"It Seems Like You're Ready" is a song by musician R. Kelly, on his debut solo studio album titled 12 Play. It is the fourth song on the album and was charted at #59 on the Billboard airplay chart, number 29 on the Rhythmic Top 40 charts and number 29 at the Hot R&B/Hip Hop Songs charts.

Charts

Later samples

"I Should Be..." by Dru Hill from the album Dru World Order (2002)
"Ridin in My Chevy" by Ghetto Mafia from the album Da Return of Ghetto Mafia (2005) 
"Temperature's Rising" by Doughbeezy from the album No Money, No Conversation EP (2011)
"Ladies Lullaby" by Chalie Boy featuring Fat Pimp from the album Baby Makin Music: The R&B Files (2011)
"Seems Like You Ready" by Jae Millz featuring Corte Ellis from the album The Virgo Part 4: How Nasty Can He Get (2012)
"Songs on 12 Play" by Chris Brown featuring Trey Songz from the album X (2014)
"Start a Fire" by Lil Wayne featuring Christina Milian from the album Tha Carter V (2014)

Covers
Singer Colton Ford has covered this song on his album Under the Covers. (2009)

References

R. Kelly songs
Songs written by R. Kelly
Song recordings produced by R. Kelly
1993 songs
1990s ballads
Contemporary R&B ballads